Chileulia is a genus of moths belonging to the family Tortricidae.

Species
Chileulia stalactitis (Meyrick, 1931)
Chileulia yerbalocae Razowski & Pelz, 2010

References

 , 1986, Pan-Pacif. Ent. 62: 395.
 , 2005, World Catalogue of Insects 5
  2010: Tortricidae from Chile (Lepidoptera: Tortricidae). Shilap Revista de Lepidopterologia 38 (149): 5-55.

External links
tortricidae.com

Euliini
Tortricidae genera